Kastenmeier is a surname. Notable people with the surname include:

Florian Kastenmeier (born 1997), German footballer
Robert Kastenmeier (1924–2015), American politician